Dante Guimarães Santos do Amaral (born 30 September 1980) is a former Brazilian professional volleyball player, who is best known as Dante.
He was born in Itumbiara.

Biography

Early years

Career
Dante began his professional career in 1999 with the club Tres Corações. After another two years at Brazilian clubs Suzano São Paulo and Minas Belo Horizonte, in 2002 he got transferred to Italy, playing with Pallavolo Modena, where he won the CEV Cup. In 2005 he joined Greek team Panathinaikos. He won the Greek championship in 2006 and the Greek cup and supercup in 2007.

Dante was also a member of the Brazil men's national volleyball team since 1999. Among the titles he has won with Brazil is the Olympic gold medal in 2004 and the World Championship in 2002 and 2006. In both the 2004 Olympic Games and 2006 World Championship he was nominated as the best spiker, while he was the best blocker in 2005 World League.

Amaral won the Best Spiker award in the 2011 South American Championship. His team won the gold medal and the 2011 World Cup berth.

Sporting achievements

Clubs
 2001/2002  Brazilian Superliga, with Minas Tênis Clube
 2005/2006  Greek League, with Panathinaikos Athens
 2012/2013  Brazilian Superliga, with Minas Tênis Clube
 2016/2017  Greek League, with P.A.O.K. Thessaloniki

CEV Champions League
  2002/2003 – with Modena Volley
 2009/2010 – with Dynamo Moscow
  2010/2011 – with Dynamo Moscow

CEV Challenge Cup
  2003/2004 – with Modena Volley

National team
 1999  South American Championship
 2001  FIVB World League
 2001  South American Championship
 2001  FIVB World Grand Champions Cup
 2002  FIVB World League
 2002  FIVB World Championship
 2003  FIVB World League
 2003  South American Championship
 2003  FIVB World Cup
 2003  Pan American Games
 2004  FIVB World League
 2004  Olympic Games
 2005  FIVB World League
 2005  South American Championship
 2006  FIVB World League
 2006  FIVB World Championship
 2007  FIVB World League
 2007  FIVB World Cup
 2007  Pan American Games
 2008  Olympic Games
 2010  FIVB World League
 2010  FIVB World Championship
 2011  FIVB World League
 2011  FIVB World Cup
 2012  Olympic Games
 2013  FIVB World League

Individual
 2004 FIVB World League – Best Receiver
 2004 Summer Olympics – Best Spiker
 2005 FIVB World League – Best Blocker
 2005 America's Cup – Most Valuable Player
 2005 America's Cup – Best Attacker
 2006 FIVB World Championship – Best Spiker
 2007 FIVB World Cup – Best Spiker
 2008 FIVB World League – Best Spiker
 2010 CEV Champions League – Best Spiker
 2010 Memorial of Hubert Jerzy Wagner – Best Receiver
 2011 South American Championship – Best Spiker
 2014 Kurowashiki Tournament – Ideal Player

References

External links
 Dante Amaral at the International Volleyball Federation
 
 
 

1980 births
Brazilian men's volleyball players
Olympic volleyball players of Brazil
Olympic gold medalists for Brazil
Olympic silver medalists for Brazil
Volleyball players at the 2000 Summer Olympics
Volleyball players at the 2004 Summer Olympics
Volleyball players at the 2008 Summer Olympics
Volleyball players at the 2012 Summer Olympics
Volleyball players at the 2003 Pan American Games
Volleyball players at the 2007 Pan American Games
Living people
Sportspeople from Goiás
Olympic medalists in volleyball
Medalists at the 2012 Summer Olympics
Medalists at the 2008 Summer Olympics
Medalists at the 2004 Summer Olympics
Panathinaikos V.C. players
PAOK V.C. players
Pan American Games gold medalists for Brazil
Pan American Games bronze medalists for Brazil
Pan American Games medalists in volleyball
Medalists at the 2003 Pan American Games
Medalists at the 2007 Pan American Games
Outside hitters